The women's long jump event at the 1998 Commonwealth Games was held on 19 September in Kuala Lumpur.

Results

References

Long
1998
1998 in women's athletics